The Best of Mercyful Fate is a compilation album by the band Mercyful Fate from years 1982-1984.

Track listing
"Doomed by the Living Dead" (King Diamond, Hank Shermann) – 5:08
"A Corpse Without Soul" (Diamond, Shermann) – 6:56
"Nuns Have No Fun" (Michael Denner, Diamond, Shermann) – 4:20
"Evil" (Diamond, Shermann) – 4:45
"Curse of the Pharaohs" (Diamond, Shermann) – 3:57
"Into the Coven" (Diamond, Shermann) – 5:10
"Black Funeral" (Diamond, Shermann) – 2:50
"Satan's Fall" (Diamond, Shermann) – 11:23
"A Dangerous Meeting" (Shermann) – 5:11
"Desecration of Souls" (Denner, Shermann) – 4:55
"Gypsy" (Denner, Diamond) – 3:09
"Come to the Sabbath" (Diamond) – 5:19
"Burning the Cross" (Diamond, Benny Petersen) – 8:48
"Return of the Vampire" (Shermann) – 4:49

Credits
King Diamond - vocals, keyboards
Hank Shermann - guitar
Michael Denner - guitar
Timi Hansen - bass
Kim Ruzz - drums
Benny Petersen - guitar
Mark Hunter (musician) - liner notes

References

Mercyful Fate albums
2003 greatest hits albums
Roadrunner Records compilation albums